North Queensland Fury FC (now called 'Northern Fury') are a semi-professional association football club who compete in the National Premier Leagues Queensland. The club is based out of Townsville, North Queensland and formerly competed professionally in the A-League. They played their home games at Dairy Farmers Stadium since their foundation in 2009 until folding from the A-League. Since then the team has played out of the smaller Murray Sporting Complex.

This list encompasses the major honours won by North Queensland Fury FC, records set by their players, managers and the club in first tier (A-League) competition. The player records section includes details of the club's leading goalscorers and those who have made most appearances in first-team competitions. It also records notable achievements by North Queensland Fury FC players. Attendance records at Dairy Farmers Stadium are also included in the list.

Honours

Domestic
A-League
Premiers (0): None
Runners-Up (0): None

A-League Finals Series
Champions (0): None
Runners-Up (0): None
Appearances (0): None

Appearances

Individual Records 
Correct as of 3 June 2015.
Most appearances in all competitions: 49,  David Williams
Most A-League appearances: 49,  David Williams

Youngest debutant: 18 years, 316 days,  Jack Hingert v. Sydney FC – 8 August 2009. 
Oldest first team player: 33 years, 319 days,  Ufuk Talay v. Brisbane Roar – 8 February 20114. 

Most consecutive appearances: 35,  Justin Pasfield, (28 November 2009 – 2 January 2011).

Most appearances
Correct as of 3 June 2015

A.  Includes finals series.

B.  FFA Cup only.

C.  AFC Champions League only.

D.  Other matches include OFC Club Championship Australian Qualifying Tournament (2005), Pre-Season Cup (2005–2008), Club World Cup, and the Pan-Pacific Championship (2008–2009).

Goalscorers 
Updated 3 June 2015.

Domestic
Inaugural goalscorer:  Rostyn Griffiths v. Sydney FC – 8 August 2009. 
Most league goals: 9,  Robbie Fowler
Most goals in a league season: 9,  Robbie Fowler, 2009–10 season.
Most goals in a league match:

 
Most consecutive goalscoring appearances: 3,  Robbie Fowler, (28 August 2009 – 15 September 2009).
Youngest goalscorer: 19 years, 325 days,  Chris Payne v. Perth Glory – 6 August 2010.
Oldest goalscorer: 34 years, 264 days,  Ufuk Talay v. Sydney FC – 15 December 2010.

Top goalscorers
This lists of the top scorers in competitive matches for the club. All current players are in bold. Appearances shown in brackets. 
Correct as of 1 June 2015.

A.  Include finals series.

B.  FFA Cup only.

C.  For the purposes of this table, Asia also includes the 2005 OFC Club Championship.

D.  Other matches include OFC Club Championship Australian Qualifying Tournament (2005), Pre-Season Cup (2005–2008), Club World Cup, and the Pan-Pacific Championship (2008–2009).

Managerial records
Managers listed in order first game in charge of the team.
Competitive matches only. These include A-League, FFA Cup, Asian Champions League, 
Correct as of 3 June 2015.

Team records
All records and statistics in this section span across all competitive fixtures. 'Regular season' indicates home and away league games only, it does not include finals series (unless stated otherwise). Records for home and away do not include results in competitions that primarily used neutral venues, including OFC Champions League, A-League Pre-Season Challenge Cup, Club World Cup and Pan-Pacific Championship
Correct as of 18 May 2015.

Biggest winning margin: 2 goals, v. Gold Coast United, 31 October 2009.
Biggest losing margin: 7 goals, v. Adelaide United, 21 January 2011.
Most goals scored in a match: 3, v. Adelaide United, 28 August 2009 and v. Perth Glory, 6 August 2010.
Most goals conceded in a match: 8, v. Adelaide United, 21 January 2011.
Most consecutive wins: 2
Most consecutive defeats: 8
Most consecutive games without defeat: 5
Most consecutive games without a win: 11
Most consecutive games without conceding: 1
Most consecutive games without scoring: 2

See also

 List of North Queensland Fury FC seasons

References

External links
 Official website

Northern Fury FC